Piro is a Maipurean language spoken in Peru. It belongs to the Piro group which also includes Iñapari (†) and Apurinã. The principal variety is Yine. The Manchineri who live in Brazil (Acre) and reportedly also in Bolivia speak what may be a dialect of Yine (Aikhenvald, Kaufman).  A vocabulary labeled Canamaré is "so close to Piro [Yine] as to count as Piro", but has been a cause of confusion with the unrelated Kanamarí language.

Names
This language is also called Contaquiro, Pira, Piro, Pirro, Simiranch, or Simirinche.  Cushichineri has been reported as a language, but is actually a family name used with Whites (Matteson 1965). The name Mashco has sometimes been incorrectly applied to the Yine. (See Mashco Piro.)

Varieties
Extinct varieties of Piro (Yine):
Chontaquiro (Simirinche, Upatarinavo): Ucayali River
Manchineri (Manatinavo): Purus River
Kushichineri (Kuxiti-neri, Kujigeneri, Cusitinavo): upper Purus River in Peru (in 1886, spoken on the Curumahá River or Curanja River, and probably also on the Cujar River)
Kuniba (Kunibo): Juruá River
Katukina: Juruá River. Documented by Natterer (1833). Not to be confused with the unrelated Katukina language.
Canamare (Canamirim, Canamary): Iaco River, a tributary of the Purus River. Documented by Spix (1819). Not to be confused with the unrelated Kanamarí language.
Mashco-Piro: Madre de Dios River

Demographics
As of 2000, essentially all of the 4,000 ethnic Yine people speak the language. They live in the Ucayali and Cusco Departments, near the Ucayali River, and near the Madre de Dios River in the Madre de Dios Region in Peru. Literacy is comparatively high. A dictionary has been published in the language and the language is taught alongside Spanish in some Yine schools. There are also a thousand speakers of Machinere.

Phonology

Vowels 

 Vowels are nasalized after .

Consonants 

/w/ is heard as a bilabial approximant  when before a close vowel.
/n/ is heard as  before /k/.
/ɾ/ can be trilled  when in word-initial position.

Syntax
Piro has an active–stative syntax.

Notes

Further reading

References

 Matteson, Esther. (1965). The Piro (Arawakan) language. University of California Publications in Linguistics, 42. Berkeley y Los Angeles: University of California Press. (Es la tesis para doctorado presentada en 1963 a la University of California, Los Angeles.)
 Nies, Joyce, compilador. (1986). Diccionario piro (Tokanchi gikshijikowaka-steno). Serie Lingüística Peruana, 22. Yarinacocha: Ministerio de Educación and Instituto Lingüístico de Verano.
 Parker, Stephen. (1989). "Un análisis métrico del acento en el piro". Estudios etno-lingüísticos, Stephen Parker (ed.), pp. 114–125. Documento de trabajo 21. Yarinacocha, Pucallpa: Ministerio de Educación e Instituto Lingüístico de Verano.
 Solís Fonseca, Gustavo. (2003). Lenguas en la amazonía peruana. Lima: edición por demanda.

 Urquía Sebastián, Rittma. (2006). Yine. Ilustraciones fonéticas de lenguas amerindias, ed. Stephen A. Marlett. Lima: SIL International and Universidad Ricardo Palma.
 
 Urquía Sebastián, Rittma and Wagner Urquía Sebastián. (2009). Diccionario yine–castellano
 

Arawakan languages
Languages of Peru
Mamoré–Guaporé linguistic area